LeBoeuf Creek is an  long tributary of French Creek in Erie County, Pennsylvania in the United States.

Course 
LeBoeuf Creek originates in Summit Township and meanders south before crossing under U.S. Route 19. Its East Branch tributary originates in Greene Township and flows south until meets with the main branch in Waterford Township. In Waterford, it passes under the Waterford Covered Bridge and heads west, back under US 19 and flows into Lake LeBoeuf. Lake LeBoeuf empties into LeBoeuf Creek at its southern end. The creek crosses under US 19 again and continues south where empties into French Creek near Mill Village.

History 
The creek was named for the buffalo at its banks seen by early French pioneers.

In 1753, Fort Le Boeuf was built by Paul Marin de la Malgue along the banks of LeBoeuf Creek, near present-day Waterford, to help protect French interests in the Ohio Country from the British. George Washington was sent by British to Fort Le Boeuf to deliver a message to the French that demanded that they leave the Ohio Country.

See also 
 List of rivers of Pennsylvania
 List of tributaries of the Allegheny River

References 

Rivers of Pennsylvania
Tributaries of the Allegheny River
Rivers of Erie County, Pennsylvania